Millennium Monsterwork 2000 is a live album by Fantômas and Melvins taken from a New Year's Eve 2000 performance at Slim's which was released in 2002 through Ipecac Recordings.

Track listing

Personnel
Dale Crover - drums, vocals
Trevor Dunn - bass
King Buzzo - guitar, vocals
Dave Lombardo - drums
Mike Patton - vocals, samples, "electronics"
Kevin Rutmanis - bass
Dave Stone - guitar, "electronics"

Additional personnel
Vince DeFranco - producer, engineer
John Golden - mastering
Vinny Palese - live recording
Randy Hawkins - live sound
Mackie Osborne - art

References

Fantômas (band) albums
Split albums
Melvins live albums
2002 live albums
Ipecac Recordings live albums